Waldrausch may refer to:

 Waldrausch (novel), a 1907 German novel by Ludwig Ganghofer
 Waldrausch (1939 film), a film adaptation
 Waldrausch (1962 film), a film adaptation
 Waldrausch (1977 film), a film adaptation